The 1936 Little All-America college football team is composed of college football players from small colleges and universities who were selected by the Associated Press (AP) as the best players at each position. For 1936, the AP did not select a second team but instead chose multiple players for "honorable mention" at each position.

Selections
QB - Douglas Locke, St. Mary’s (TX)
HB - Dick Riffle, Albright
HB - Mickey Kobrosky, Trinity (CT)
FB - Richard Wesiberger, Willamette
E - Henry Hammond, Southwestern (TN)
E - Leo Deutsch, St. Benedict's (KS)
T - George Mike, West Virginia Wesleyan
T - Ralph Niehaus, Dayton
G - Doug Oldershaw, Santa Barbara State
G - George Anderson, Middlebury
C - Norman Cooper, Howard (AL)

See also
 1936 College Football All-America Team

References

Little All-America college football team
Little All-America college football teams